Schwarzach is a river of Baden-Württemberg, Germany. It is a right tributary of the Danube at Riedlingen.

See also

List of rivers of Baden-Württemberg

References

Rivers of Baden-Württemberg
Rivers of Germany